Jeff Ma or Jeffrey Ma (born 1973) is a former member of the MIT Blackjack Team in the mid-1990s. He graduated from Phillips Exeter Academy. He attended MIT where he graduated with a degree in mechanical engineering in 1994. He was the basis for the main character of the book Bringing Down the House (where he was renamed Kevin Lewis) and the film 21 (where he was renamed Ben Campbell). Ma also co-founded PROTRADE (a sports stock market website, that has since been shut down) and does consulting work for professional sports teams including the Portland Trail Blazers and San Francisco 49ers. He cofounded Citizen Sports, a sport-information website and iPhone application based in San Francisco, which was acquired by Yahoo! in May 2010.

His first book, The House Advantage: Playing the Odds to Win Big In Business, was published in July 2010 by Palgrave Macmillan. Ma is a regular speaker at corporate events and conferences where he talks about how to use data and analytics to make better business decisions.

Ma made a cameo in the film 21 as a blackjack dealer named Jeffrey at the Planet Hollywood Resort and Casino. Jim Sturgess's character, Ben Campbell, refers to Jeffrey as "my brother from another mother."

Ma joined ESPN in November 2014 as their Predictive Analytics Expert. Per this arrangement, he does weekly TV appearances on SportsCenter and contributes as a writer on ESPN.com.

In 2017, Ma started the Bet the Process podcast, a "sports gambling and analytics podcast," and began appearing on The Tony Kornheiser Show podcast, picking college and NFL football games.

In November 2018, Ma was appointed Senior Vice President of Product and Analytics at Duetto.

In May 2020, Ma became Vice President for Microsoft for Startups, a unit focused on recruiting startups to use Microsoft technologies.

References

External links
 
 "New film '21' counts on the real deal for inspiration", USA Today, March 26, 2008.
 Jeffrey Ma at AtGoogleTalks
 "Jeff Ma Publishes 'The House Advantage'", Hyphen magazine.

1973 births
American blackjack players
American chief executives
American people of Chinese descent
Living people
MIT School of Engineering alumni
Phillips Exeter Academy alumni
Place of birth missing (living people)